The following highways are numbered 6N:

United States
 U.S. Route 6N
 U.S. Route 6N (New York) (former)
 U.S. Route 6N (Pennsylvania) (former)
 New York State Route 6N